The National Football Championship for Hero Santosh Trophy, due to sponsorship ties with Hero MotoCorp also known as the Hero National Football Championship, or simply Santosh Trophy, is a state-level national football competition contested by the state associations and government institutions under the All India Football Federation (AIFF), the sport's governing body in India. Before the starting of the first national club league, the National Football League in 1996, the Santosh Trophy was considered the top domestic honour in India. Many players who have represented India internationally, played and gained honour while playing in the Santosh Trophy. The tournament is held every year with eligible teams who are divided into zones, must play in the qualifying round and can progress into the tournament proper. The current champions are Karnataka, who won their title after 54 years during the 2022-23 edition. This was the first trophy for Karnataka, which had previously won four times as the princely state of Mysore, after a gap of 54 years (after 1968-69).

The tournament was started in 1941 by Indian Football Association (IFA), which was the then de facto governing body of football in India. It was named after the former president of the IFA, Sir Manmatha Nath Roy Chowdhury, the Maharaja of Santosh who had died at the age of 61 in 1939.
The IFA later donated the Santosh Trophy to the AIFF, soon after its formation as the sport's official governing body in India, and since then AIFF has been organising the tournament. The trophy for the runner-up, Kamala Gupta Trophy, was also donated by the then president of IFA, Dr. S.K. Gupta, and it was named in honour of his wife. The third-place trophy, Sampangi Cup, was donated by the Karnataka State Football Association (then Mysore Football Association) and was named so in the memory of a renowned footballer, Sampangi, who was from Mysore. Until 2018, the tournament was organised as an individual competition, but since 2021, the AIFF rebranded it as the men's senior tier of National Football Championship for the regional teams of various age groups. In September 2022, it was announced that the tournament will be organized on zonal basis.

Background

The Santosh Trophy was started in 1941 after the former president of the Indian Football Association, Sir Manmatha Nath Roy Chowdhary of Santosh and later, Sir Satish Chandra Chowdhury donated the trophy to the All India Football Federation. At the time of the first tournament, India lacked a proper championship for football teams. The other major nationwide football competitions at the time were Durand Cup, Rovers Cup and IFA Shield. In 1990, in an attempt to bring through more younger players, the AIFF made the Santosh Trophy into an under-23 competition. This move only lasted for three seasons before the tournament was reverted to a senior competition.

During his time as the head coach of India, Bob Houghton called for the tournament to be discontinued and that it was a waste of time and talent. He was more aggressive against the tournament after striker Sunil Chhetri injured himself in the 2009 Santosh Trophy and had to miss the Nehru Cup. As a result, national team players were not allowed to participate in the tournament, which was also eventually reverted. In 2013 the AIFF decided that players from the top-tier clubs would be barred from participating in the Santosh Trophy, but numerous members of reserve, academy and youth sides of the I-League and the Indian Super League participate in the tournament for game-time. The tournament still is regarded as a suitable platform for young players to attract the eyes of scouts of major clubs in the country.

Current teams
The following teams participate in the tournament as states, union territories and institutions.

 Andaman and Nicobar Islands
 Andhra Pradesh
 Arunachal Pradesh
 Assam
 Bihar
 Chandigarh
 Chhattisgarh
 Dadra and Nagar Haveli and Daman and Diu
 Delhi
 Goa
 Gujarat
 Haryana
 Himachal Pradesh
 Jammu and Kashmir
 Jharkhand
 Karnataka
 Kerala
 Ladakh
 Lakshadweep
 Madhya Pradesh
 Maharashtra
 Manipur
 Meghalaya
 Mizoram
 Nagaland
 Odisha
 Puducherry
 Punjab
 Rajasthan
 Railways
 Services
 Sikkim
 Tamil Nadu
 Telangana
 Tripura
 Uttar Pradesh
 Uttarakhand
 West Bengal

Results

Finals
The following is the list of winners and runners-up from every edition of the Santosh Trophy

Final appearances

References

 
Football cup competitions in India
Recurring sporting events established in 1941
1941 establishments in India